The 2014–15 Continental Cup was the 18th edition of the IIHF Continental Cup. The season started on 26 September 2014. The Super Final was played in Bremerhaven, Germany on 9–11 January 2015. The tournament was won by Neman Grodno, who led the final group. They also qualified for the 2015–16 Champions Hockey League.

Qualified teams

 Kompanion-Naftogaz withdrew its participation and was replaced by the Belfast Giants as the second-ranked team of the second round with the best record.

First group stage

First round games was played on 26–28 September 2014.

Group A

(Sofia, Bulgaria)

Group A standings

 Winner CSKA Sofia promoted for next round Group B.

Second group stage

Second round games was played on 17–19 October 2014.

Group B

(Bremerhaven, Germany)

Group B standings

 Winner Fischtown Pinguins promoted for next round Group D.
 Due to the withdrawal of the Kompanion-Naftogaz, Belfast Giants as the higher ranked second placed team from the second round advances to the next round Group E.

Group C

(Brașov, Romania)

Group C standings

 Winner Sanok promoted for next round Group E.

Third group stage

Third round games was played on 21–23 November 2014. The top-two ranked teams of each third round group promoted for the Super final.

Group D

(Ritten, Italy)

Group D standings

 Yertis Pavlodar and Fischtown Pinguins promoted for the final round.

Group E

(Angers, France)

 Kompanion-Naftogaz withdrew its participation and was replaced by the Belfast Giants as the second ranked team of the second round with the best record.

Group E standings

 Ducs d'Angers and Neman Grodno promoted for the final round.

Super final

Super final was played on 9–11 January 2015.

Final group

(Bremerhaven, Germany)

Final standings

 Neman Grodno wins the 2015 IIHF Continental Cup to become the qualifier for next season's Champions Hockey League.

References

External links
 Official IIHF tournament page

IIHF Continental Cup
2014–15 in European ice hockey